Yirrkala macrodon is an eel in the family Ophichthidae (worm/snake eels). It was described by Pieter Bleeker in 1863, originally under the genus Sphagebranchus. It is a marine, tropical eel which is known from Borneo, in the western central Pacific Ocean.

References

Ophichthidae
Fish described in 1863